In mathematics, a simple Lie group is a connected non-abelian Lie group G which does not have nontrivial connected normal subgroups. The list of simple Lie groups can be used to read off the list of simple Lie algebras and Riemannian symmetric spaces.

Together with the commutative Lie group of the real numbers, and that of the unit-magnitude complex numbers, U(1) (the unit circle), simple Lie groups give the atomic "blocks" that make up all (finite-dimensional) connected Lie groups via the operation of group extension. Many commonly encountered Lie groups are either simple or 'close' to being simple: for example, the so-called "special linear group" SL(n) of n by n matrices with determinant equal to 1 is simple for all n > 1.

The first classification of simple Lie groups was by Wilhelm Killing, and this work was later perfected by Élie Cartan. The final classification is often referred to as Killing-Cartan classification.

Definition
Unfortunately, there is no universally accepted definition of a simple Lie group. In particular, it is not always defined as a Lie group that is simple as an abstract group. Authors differ on whether a simple Lie group has to be connected, or on whether it is allowed to have a non-trivial center, or on whether  is a simple Lie group.

The most common definition is that a Lie group is simple if it is connected, non-abelian, and every closed connected normal subgroup is either the identity or the whole group. In particular, simple groups are allowed to have a non-trivial center, but  is not simple.

In this article the connected simple Lie groups with trivial center are listed.  Once these are known, the ones with non-trivial center are easy to list as follows. Any simple Lie group with trivial center has a universal cover, whose center is the fundamental group of the simple Lie group. The corresponding simple Lie groups with non-trivial center can be obtained as quotients of this universal cover by a subgroup of the center.

Alternatives
An equivalent definition of a simple Lie group follows from the Lie correspondence: A connected Lie group is simple if its Lie algebra is simple. An important technical point is that a simple Lie group may contain discrete normal subgroups. For this reason, the definition of a simple Lie group is not equivalent to the definition of a Lie group that is simple as an abstract group.

Simple Lie groups include many classical Lie groups, which provide a group-theoretic underpinning for spherical geometry, projective geometry and related geometries in the sense of Felix Klein's Erlangen program. It emerged in the course of classification of simple Lie groups that there exist also several exceptional possibilities not corresponding to any familiar geometry. These exceptional groups account for many special examples and configurations in other branches of mathematics, as well as contemporary theoretical physics.

As a counterexample, the general linear group is neither simple, nor semisimple. This is because multiples of the identity form a nontrivial normal subgroup, thus evading the definition.  Equivalently, the corresponding Lie algebra has a degenerate Killing form, because multiples of the identity map to the zero element of the algebra. Thus, the corresponding Lie algebra is also neither simple nor semisimple. Another counter-example are the special orthogonal groups in even dimension. These have the matrix  in the center, and this element is path-connected to the identity element, and so these groups evade the definition. Both of these are reductive groups.

Related ideas

Simple Lie algebras

The Lie algebra of a simple Lie group is a simple Lie algebra. This is a one-to-one correspondence between connected simple Lie groups with trivial center and simple Lie algebras of dimension greater than 1. (Authors differ on whether the one-dimensional Lie algebra should be counted as simple.)

Over the complex numbers the semisimple Lie algebras are classified by their Dynkin diagrams, of types "ABCDEFG". If L is a real simple Lie algebra, its complexification is a simple complex Lie algebra, unless L is already the complexification of a Lie algebra, in which case the complexification of L is a product of two copies of L. This reduces the problem of classifying the real simple Lie algebras to that of finding all the real forms of each complex simple Lie algebra (i.e., real Lie algebras whose complexification is the given complex Lie algebra). There are always at least 2 such forms: a split form and a compact form, and there are usually a few others. The different real forms correspond to the classes of automorphisms of order at most 2 of the complex Lie algebra.

Symmetric spaces

Symmetric spaces are classified as follows.

First, the universal cover of a symmetric space is still symmetric, so we can reduce to the case of simply connected symmetric spaces. (For example, the universal cover of a real projective plane is a sphere.)

Second, the product of symmetric spaces is symmetric, so we may as well just classify the irreducible simply connected ones (where irreducible means they cannot be written as a product of smaller symmetric spaces).

The irreducible simply connected symmetric spaces are the real line, and exactly two symmetric spaces corresponding to  each non-compact simple Lie group G,
one compact and one non-compact. The non-compact one is a cover of the quotient of G by a maximal compact subgroup H, and the compact one is a cover of the quotient of
the compact form of G by the same subgroup H. This duality between compact and non-compact symmetric spaces is a generalization of the well known duality between spherical and hyperbolic geometry.

Hermitian symmetric spaces

A symmetric space with a compatible complex structure is called Hermitian.  The compact simply connected irreducible Hermitian symmetric spaces fall into 4 infinite families with 2 exceptional ones left over, and each has a non-compact dual. In addition the complex plane is also a Hermitian symmetric space; this gives the complete list of irreducible Hermitian symmetric spaces.

Notation
  stand for the real numbers, complex numbers, quaternions, and octonions.

In the symbols such as E6−26 for the exceptional groups, the exponent −26 is the signature of an invariant symmetric bilinear form that is negative definite on the maximal compact subgroup. It is equal to the dimension of the group minus twice the dimension of a maximal compact subgroup.

The fundamental group listed in the table below is the fundamental group of the simple group with trivial center. 
Other simple groups with the same Lie algebra correspond to subgroups of this fundamental group (modulo the action of the outer automorphism group).

Full classification
Simple Lie groups are fully classified. The classification is usually stated in several steps, namely:
 Classification of simple complex Lie algebras The classification of simple Lie algebras over the complex numbers by Dynkin diagrams.
 Classification of simple real Lie algebras Each simple complex Lie algebra has several real forms, classified by additional decorations of its Dynkin diagram called Satake diagrams, after Ichirô Satake.
 Classification of simple Lie groups
One can show that the fundamental group of any Lie group is a discrete commutative group. Now any (real or complex) Lie group can be obtained by applying this construction to centerless Lie groups. Note that real Lie groups obtained this way might not be real forms of any complex group. A very important example of such a real group is the metaplectic group, which appears in infinite-dimensional representation theory and physics. When one takes for  the full fundamental group, the resulting Lie group  is the universal cover of the centerless Lie group , and is simply connected. In particular, every (real or complex) Lie algebra also corresponds to a unique connected and simply connected Lie group  with that Lie algebra, called the "simply connected Lie group" associated to

Compact Lie groups

Every simple complex Lie algebra has a unique real form whose corresponding centerless Lie group is compact. It turns out that the simply connected Lie group in these cases is also compact. Compact Lie groups have a particularly tractable representation theory because of the Peter–Weyl theorem. Just like simple complex Lie algebras, centerless compact Lie groups are classified by Dynkin diagrams (first classified by Wilhelm Killing and Élie Cartan).

For the infinite (A, B, C, D) series of Dynkin diagrams, a connected compact Lie group associated to each Dynkin diagram can be explicitly described as a matrix group, with the corresponding centerless compact Lie group described as the quotient by a subgroup of scalar matrices. For those of type A and C we can find explicit matrix representations of the corresponding simply connected Lie group as matrix groups.

Overview of the classification
Ar has as its associated simply connected compact group the special unitary group, SU(r + 1) and as its associated centerless compact group the projective unitary group PU(r + 1).

Br has as its associated centerless compact groups the odd special orthogonal groups, SO(2r + 1). This group is not simply connected however: its universal (double) cover is the Spin group.

Cr has as its associated simply connected group the group of unitary symplectic matrices, Sp(r) and as its associated centerless group the Lie group PSp(r) = Sp(r)/{I, −I} of projective unitary symplectic matrices. The symplectic groups have a double-cover by the metaplectic group.

Dr has as its associated compact group the even special orthogonal groups, SO(2r) and as its associated centerless compact group the projective special orthogonal group PSO(2r) = SO(2r)/{I, −I}. As with the B series, SO(2r) is not simply connected; its universal cover is again the spin group, but the latter again has a center (cf. its article).

The diagram D2 is two isolated nodes, the same as A1 ∪ A1, and this coincidence corresponds to the covering map homomorphism from SU(2) × SU(2) to SO(4) given by quaternion multiplication; see quaternions and spatial rotation. Thus SO(4) is not a simple group. Also, the diagram D3 is the same as A3, corresponding to a covering map homomorphism from SU(4) to SO(6).

In addition to the four families Ai, Bi, Ci, and Di above, there are five so-called exceptional Dynkin diagrams G2, F4, E6, E7, and E8; these exceptional Dynkin diagrams also have associated simply connected and centerless compact groups. However, the groups associated to the exceptional families are more difficult to describe than those associated to the infinite families, largely because their descriptions make use of exceptional objects. For example, the group associated to G2 is the automorphism group of the octonions, and the group associated to F4 is the automorphism group of a certain Albert algebra.

See also E.

List

Abelian

Notes
 The group  is not 'simple' as an abstract group, and according to most (but not all) definitions this is not a simple Lie group. Further, most authors do not count its Lie algebra as a simple Lie algebra. It is listed here so that the list of "irreducible simply connected symmetric spaces" is complete. Note that  is the only such non-compact symmetric space without a compact dual (although it has a compact quotient S1).

Compact

Split

Complex

Others

Simple Lie groups of small dimension

The following table lists some Lie groups with simple Lie algebras of small 
dimension. The groups on a given line all have the same Lie algebra. In the dimension 1 case, the groups are abelian and not simple.

Simply laced groups
A simply laced group is a Lie group whose Dynkin diagram only contain simple links, and therefore all the nonzero roots of the corresponding Lie algebra have the same length. The A, D and E series groups are all simply laced, but no group of type B, C, F, or G is simply laced.

See also
Cartan matrix
Coxeter matrix
Weyl group
Coxeter group
Kac–Moody algebra
Catastrophe theory

References

Further reading
 Besse, Einstein manifolds 
 Helgason, Differential geometry, Lie groups, and symmetric spaces. 
 Fuchs and Schweigert, Symmetries, Lie algebras, and representations: a graduate course for physicists. Cambridge University Press, 2003.  

Lie groups
Lie algebras